The A-Files is a 1998 video game for Windows and Macintosh by Norwegian developer Gyldendal, in collaboration with  five book publishers in the Nordic region. The game was "relatively inexpensive" to produce. It was authored by  Paul Westlake and Fiona Miller.

The game became popular throughout the Nordic countries and was also sold in Germany, Italy and Holland.

Awards 

 "The New Media Prize" in Bologna, Italy.
 "Best interactive production of the year" in Gullklappan 99, Sweden .
 "Education & Home Learning" at the International EMMA Awards in Amsterdam.

References 

1998 video games
Adventure games
Educational video games
Europe-exclusive video games
Classic Mac OS games
Video games developed in Norway
Windows games